SO8 may refer to :
 code for Forensic Science Laboratory in the Specialist Operations, a directorate of the Metropolitan Police
 6639 Marchis (1989 SO8), a Main-belt Asteroid discovered on September 25, 1989

So8 may refer to :
 code for Withypool during the Survey of English Dialects
and also :
 SO(8), the special orthogonal group acting on eight-dimensional Euclidean space in mathematics
 SO8, an Integrated Circuit packaging technology. See Small-outline integrated circuit.